Charles Frederick Albright (August 10, 1933 – August 22, 2020) also known as the Eyeball Killer, was an American murderer from Texas who was convicted of killing one woman and suspected of killing two others in 1991. He was incarcerated in the John Montford Psychiatric Unit in Lubbock, Texas.

Life history

Childhood
Born in Amarillo, Texas, Charles Albright was adopted from an orphanage by Delle and Fred Albright. His adoptive mother, who was a schoolteacher, was very strict and overprotective of him. She accelerated his education and helped him skip two grades.

Adolescence
When he got his first gun as a teenager, Albright killed small animals with it. His mother would help him stuff them, due to his interest in becoming a taxidermist.

At age 13, he was already a petty thief and was arrested for aggravated assault. At age 15, he graduated from high school and enrolled at North Texas University. He expressed an interest in training as a medical doctor and a surgeon. He undertook pre-med training but failed to complete it. At age 16, the police caught him with stolen petty cash, two handguns, and a rifle. He spent a year in jail.

Adulthood

After his release from jail, he attended Arkansas State Teachers College and majored in pre-med studies. After being found with stolen items, he was expelled from the college but was not prosecuted.

Apparently unfazed, he falsified a degree. He stole documents and forged signatures, giving himself fictitious bachelor's and master's degrees. He married his college girlfriend, and they had a daughter. He continued to forge checks and was caught in this deception while teaching at a high school and was placed on probation. In 1965, he and his wife separated, divorcing in 1974.

He was then caught stealing hundreds of dollars worth of merchandise from a hardware store and received a two-year prison sentence. He served less than six months before being released.

During this time he began to befriend and gain the trust of his neighbors. He was even asked by local residents to babysit their children.

In 1981, while visiting some friends, he sexually molested their 14-year-old daughter. He was prosecuted, pled guilty, and received probation. He later claimed that he was innocent but had pled guilty to avoid "a hassle."

In 1984, he applied to be a leader in the Boy Scouts of America and was rejected.

In 1985 in Arkansas, Albright met a woman named Dixie and invited her to live with him. Soon she was paying his bills and supporting him. He delivered newspapers in the early morning, apparently to visit prostitutes without arousing Dixie's suspicion.

Death
Sentenced to life without parole, Albright died at the West Texas Regional Medical Facility in Lubbock, Texas, in August 2020.

Victims

December 13, 1990
Mary Lou Pratt, 33, a Caucasian well-known sex worker in the Oak Cliff neighbourhood of Dallas, was found dead,  wearing only a t-shirt and bra. She had been shot in the back of the head with a .44-caliber gun, as well as being badly beaten. The medical examiner reported that the killer had removed both of her eyes with surgical precision and had apparently taken them with him.

February 10, 1991
Susan Beth Peterson, 27, a Caucasian sex worker, was found on the same street Mary Pratt was found on, just outside the Dallas city limits near the DeSoto city limits. She was nearly nude and had been shot three times: in the top of her head, in her left breast, and in the back of her head. The medical examiner found that her eyes had been removed as well. At this point, the investigators realized they were looking for a "repeater."

March 10, 1991
Shirley Williams, an African-American sex worker, was found dead, lying near an elementary school. A waitress found Williams' nude body propped up against a curb. Her eyes had been removed, just like the previous two victims. She had facial bruises and a broken nose, and had been shot in the face and through the top of her head. A medical examiner's field agent pulled back her eyelids and discovered that her eyes were missing.

Arrest and trial 

On March 23, 1991, Albright was arrested and charged with three counts of murder. His trial began on December 13, 1991. The evidence was mostly circumstantial. 

On December 18, 1991, the jury deliberated and found him guilty only of the murder of Shirley Williams.

During the trial a hair comparison expert testified hairs found at the Williams murder matched Albright's hair. Later DNA testing indicated the hairs were from a dog.

Media
The May 1993 Texas Monthly magazine article, “See No Evil” asked the question 'How does a perfect gentleman become a vicious murderer?'

The Eyeball Killer was authored by John Matthews (the Dallas police officer who with his partner Regina Smith was instrumental in identifying Albright as the murderer) and newspaper journalist Christine Wicker.

The American documentary series Forensic Files documents the Albright case in the episode titled "See No Evil", originally aired June 14, 2001.

The Home Box Office (HBO) television network released Albright's story sub-titled "The Collector" on the Autopsy series under episode 5; "Autopsy 5: Dead Men Do Tell Tales", aired 1998.

The Investigation Discovery network reported the manhunt for Albright in the Evil, I episode "Eyes Are My Prize", which aired on August 27, 2013.

In 2015 the television series Born to Kill? aired an episode about Albright in season 7.

On October 20, 2016, the true crime podcast My Favorite Murder discussed the case on its 39th episode "Kind of Loco."

The Oxygen Network aired "Mark of a Killer: An Eye for Murder" about the case on February 10, 2019.

See also
 List of serial killers in the United States

References

External links
 The Texas Eyeball Killer article by truTV.com
 Charles Albright at mylifeofcrime.wordpress.com

1933 births
1991 murders in the United States
2020 deaths
20th-century American criminals
American adoptees
American male criminals
American people convicted of burglary
American people convicted of child sexual abuse
American people convicted of murder
American people convicted of theft
American prisoners sentenced to life imprisonment
Crimes against sex workers in the United States
Criminals from Texas
Human trophy collecting
People convicted of murder by Texas
People from Dallas
Prisoners sentenced to life imprisonment by Texas
Suspected serial killers
University of Central Arkansas alumni
Violence against women in the United States